"Chuck Versus the Sensei" is the ninth episode of the second season of Chuck. It originally aired on December 1, 2008. Chuck Bartowski is still reeling from the discovery that his ex-girlfriend Jill Roberts was a Fulcrum agent and goes on a mission to take his mind off of his shock. John Casey gets a shock of his own when he finds out that his sensei Ty Bennett (Carl Lumbly), who taught him everything he knows, is now one of the most wanted rogue agents. While on the search for Bennett, it becomes clear that Casey may be too emotionally involved to continue with the mission. Meanwhile, Devon Woodcomb's parents Honey (Morgan Fairchild) and Woody (Bruce Boxleitner) make a surprise visit to help Devon and Ellie Bartowski plan their wedding. At the Buy More, Emmett Milbarge (Tony Hale) reinstates the employee of the month contest, but Morgan Grimes, Jeff Barnes, and Lester Patel have other plans.

Plot

Main plot
The episode begins with a flashback to a top-secret location in 1994, where John Casey, wearing a Van Dyke beard and long hair, trains with his sensei Ty Bennett (Carl Lumbly). Bennett easily defeats Casey in a sparring match and tells him that until he finds his "calm center", he will never win. In modern day, Emmett Milbarge (Tony Hale) lectures Casey about sales at the Buy More.

At Castle, General Beckman (Bonita Friedericy) explains that Chuck Bartowski will use the Intersect to check the Global Launch Agency for possible misfeasance. Chuck agrees, regretting not having any "me time" after the departure of Jill Roberts in the previous episode. As Chuck sits in the van, Casey and Sarah Walker infiltrate the GLA disguised as lab technicians. Suddenly, a masked villain rappels from the ceiling, knocks Casey over, and steals an inertial guidance system. Casey gives chase, tackling the agile man on the agency's front lawn and removing the man's mask to reveal Ty Bennett, who escapes.

General Beckman explains that Bennett, previously a combat trainer with the NSA, is a most-wanted rogue agent working as a global arms dealer. Beckman says that any personal knowledge Casey has could be vital, before giving Casey the location of a construction site where Bennett plans to sell the stolen system. At Casey's suggestion, Beckman orders Chuck sit the mission out. As Sarah and Casey stake out the construction site, the buyer drives up. Casey and Sarah charge, guns drawn, and find a briefcase in the back seat. When it beeps like a time bomb, they narrowly escape an explosion.

Later, Bennett enters the Buy More looking for Casey. Chuck frantically calls the team, but does not get an answer, expressing the urgency to the voicemail. Meanwhile, Morgan Grimes treats the sensei like a low-level karate instructor in hopes of getting a bad customer review (see "Buy More"). An unamused Bennett intimidates Morgan by taking his soda can and crushing it with his bare hand, a feat Bennett is known for. After Bennett leaves, Chuck follows him to the parking lot, only to be ambushed and shoved in the trunk of a car. Sarah and Casey follow the tracking signal embedded in Chuck's watch, and Casey attempts to ram his mentor's car, even though he knows Chuck is trapped inside. After Bennett swerves into a parked car, Sarah saves Chuck while Casey confronts Bennett. Bennett invites Casey to be his student again and take his training to the next level, but Casey declines, growling that he is not a traitor. Bennett grabs a crane and swings to safety a floor below. At Castle, General Beckman is livid over Bennett's escape. She accuses Casey of being too close to the situation and lectures him for putting the Intersect in danger. She reveals that another team will be brought in to finish the mission, noting Casey's primary objective is to protect Chuck, greatly angering Casey.

After Casey unsuccessfully attempts to hack into the security database to stay on the case, he calls Chuck and asks if they can meet to talk about their feelings. Hoodwinked, Chuck joins Casey and is immediately put in a headlock. Casey uses Chuck's thumb print to get into the system and forces him to watch a video of the encounter in the parking garage. Chuck flashes and identifies a local dojo as a cover for illegal activities. Casey then handcuffs him to a counter in the Orange Orange yogurt shop above Castle and heads to the dojo.

Chuck manages to call Sarah and explain the situation. Chuck disobeys Sarah's order to stay at the Orange Orange, freezing his cuffs with the material used to cool yogurt and breaking them with a serving scoop. When he drives to the dojo, he is immediately held at gunpoint. Meanwhile, Sarah has joined Casey at the dojo. They break down the door to find a captured Chuck, angering Casey. Suddenly, Bennett enters with a gun. At Casey's taunt that Bennett could defeat him without a gun, the two fight hand-to-hand, and a furious fight ensues. Casey, lying on the floor after a few particularly brutal blows, appears to be beaten. Chuck coaches Casey into using his anger to fight Bennett which he explains as being that Casey has an "angry center" in lieu of the "calm center" Bennett had taught him to channel and Casey ends up defeating Bennett.

When Casey and Chuck return home, Casey mentions that he should probably thank Chuck for saving his life. Although Chuck tries to play the nicety off by saying that that is what friends do, Casey softly says "thanks" as he closes his front door.

Family
Ellie Bartowski awakens Chuck with an emergency: Devon Woodcomb's parents, both doctors and "awesome" like their son, have come to visit. In fact, they are already in the living room, Devon and his father "Woody" (Bruce Boxleitner) having just returned from a brisk morning run. His mother "Honey" (Morgan Fairchild) coos that she cannot wait to plan Ellie and Devon's dream wedding.

At dinner, Honey and Woody dominate the wedding plans until an overwhelmed Ellie cries that she can no longer answer, "yes", apologizing and storming from the table, followed by Devon.

Ellie later reveals to Chuck that she only wants for her father to walk her down the aisle. Chuck promises to find him.

Buy More
Emmett reinstates the Employee of the Month program, which will be based on customer comment cards. The winner gets his or her photograph framed to a picture of Moses Finkelstein, founder and CEO of Buy More, and a secret prize. Morgan seems skeptical and gathers the employees in the break room, conveying his opinion that hard work and higher sales would benefit only Emmett. The employees make a side bet to see who can score the lowest on their comment cards.

Emmett later confronts Morgan, Lester and Jeff with their customer service marks, revealing that their combined high score is one. He threatens that the employee with the lowest score will close the store every Saturday night for a month, motivating the employees to show hospitality to their customers.

The next day, Emmett announces the new Employee of the Month: Michael "Skip" Johnson, who apologizes for not being rude enough to the employees. Along with his name on a plaque, Skip wins a bonus gift: a 65-inch flat-screen television. Morgan, Lester Patel, and Jeff Barnes turn pale, having been bested by Emmett.

Production
This episode marked the first speaking part of Michael Kawczynski, a recurring extra since "Chuck Versus the Intersect", as Skip Johnson. Chuck begins the search for his father, a major story arc for the season.

Flashes
 Chuck flashes on a video of the encounter in the parking garage, identifying a local dojo as a cover for illegal activities.

Cultural references
 Chuck's Tron poster is briefly shown moments before Ellie introduces Chuck to her soon-to-be father-in-law, played by Bruce Boxleitner, who portrayed the eponymous character of Tron.
Emmett's characterization of Morgan, Lester, and Jeff as "Tweedledee, Tweedledumb, and Tweedledumber" alludes to characters from Alice's Adventures in Wonderland.
 Chuck attributes his escape from the Orange Orange to seven years of watching MacGyver.
 Casey asserts that Sarah "can't keep [her] chocolate out of Bartowski's peanut butter," alluding to a series of commercials that aired for Reese's Peanut Butter Cups in the 1970s and 1980s.
 When Chuck is handcuffed in the Orange Orange he says "Use the Force, Chuck," while reaching for his cell phone, referencing Star Wars and some of its characters' telekinetic abilities.
 Casey's references to "damaging his calm" alludes to the character Jayne Cobb (also played by Baldwin) in the film 'Serenity', who says this in response to River.

Critical response
"Chuck Versus the Sensei" received positive reviews from critics. Eric Goldman of IGN gave the episode a 7.4 out of 10, enjoying an episode centered on Casey, and writing that there were several fun moments as a result. However, Goldman wrote that there were also several missed opportunities, including the development of Bennett, his motives for betraying the NSA, and his relationship with Casey. Goldman wrote, "This was also one of those occasional episodes where Chuck was a bit too spastic and awkward – a little of this behavior goes a long way, and we've seen him be too clever to buy when he gets as silly as the scene where he makes Sarah play a game to guess where Casey's locked him up, rather than just tell her – Casey's (obviously empty) death threat aside."

Steve Heisler of The A.V. Club gave the episode a B−, writing that most of the episode was dominated by a "labored back-and-forth between Chuck's desire for connection and Casey's fear of it." Heisler found Chuck's desperation to relate to Casey unrealistic, as Casey had just threatened to kill him in the previous scene. Among other criticisms, Heisler called the 23-year-old Casey "unfortunately hair-cutted".

Viewer response was also  positive, with an 8.7/10 user rating at TV.com. The episode drew 7.335 million viewers.

References

External links
 

Sensei
2008 American television episodes